József "Joci" Pápai (born 22 September 1981) is a Hungarian singer, rapper and guitarist of Romani descent. He represented Hungary at the Eurovision Song Contest 2017 with the song "Origo" finishing in 8th place. He represented Hungary again at the Eurovision Song Contest 2019 with the song "Az én apám". However he failed to qualify for the grand final being the first Hungarian entry not to since returning in 2011.

Career
Pápai came into contact with music early as his older brother had started writing songs and playing guitar at the age of four. He was influenced by music of the 1960s and 1970s, and rock, pop, soul, and R&B music. His public debut was in 2005, when he was a part of the second season of the TV2 show Megasztár, where he was eliminated in the consolation rounds, but was interviewed by the Budapest daily tabloid Blikk. Afterwards, he started to produce his official debut.

His first big success was Ne nézz így rám. In 2006, he collaborated with rapper Majka with Nélküled and Nekem ez jár, but his greatest success came in 2015 with Mikor a test örexik. He then released a song in collaboration with Caramel and Zé Szabó titled Elrejtett világ. His last collaboration with Majka appeared together with the pop-funk song Senki más.

On 8 December 2016, it was announced that Pápai would be one of the thirty acts participating in the 2017 edition of A Dal, the national selection for Hungary in the Eurovision Song Contest 2017 with the self-penned "Origo", in which he progressed to the final and won the competition, giving him the right to represent Hungary in the Eurovision Song Contest 2017, coming in 8th place overall. He competed again in the 2019 edition, with the song "Az én apám". He won that as well and represented Hungary again at the Eurovision Song Contest 2019 in Tel Aviv, Israel. This time, however, he failed to qualify from the semifinal.

Discography

Studio albums

Singles

As lead artist

As featured artist

See also 
A Dal 2017

References

External links 
 Pápai Joci on MédiaKlikk
 

1981 births
Living people
21st-century Hungarian male singers
Hungarian rappers
Hungarian guitarists
Male guitarists
People from Tata, Hungary
Hungarian Romani people
Eurovision Song Contest entrants of 2017
Eurovision Song Contest entrants of 2019
Eurovision Song Contest entrants for Hungary
21st-century guitarists
Hungarian male musicians